The 1812 United States elections elected the members of the 13th United States Congress. The election took place during the First Party System, and shortly after the start of the War of 1812. The Federalist Party made a relatively strong showing, winning seats in both chambers while supporting a competitive challenge to the incumbent Democratic-Republican President. However, the Democratic-Republican Party continued its control of the Presidency and both houses of Congress.

In the Presidential election, incumbent Democratic-Republican President James Madison defeated New York Lieutenant Governor and New York City Mayor DeWitt Clinton. Clinton was a member of the Democratic-Republican Party, but his presidential bid received the support of both anti-Madison Democratic-Republicans and many Federalists. Although Madison won, the Presidential election was the closest since the 1800 election, as Clinton won New England and three mid-Atlantic states.

Following the 1810 census, 39 seats were added to the House. Federalists won major gains, but Democratic-Republicans continued to dominate the chamber.

In the Senate, Federalists picked up a small number of seats, but Democratic-Republicans retained a dominant majority.

Background 
Military conflict resulting from the Napoleonic Wars in Europe had been steadily worsening throughout James Madison's first term, and the British and French had been ignoring the neutrality of the United States at sea by seizing American ships to look for supposed deserters. The British further provoked the Americans by impressing American seamen, maintaining forts within United States territory in the Northwest, and supporting Native Americans at war with the U.S. Meanwhile, expansionists in the south and west of the United States coveted British Canada and Spanish Florida and wanted to use British provocations as a pretext to seize both areas. The pressure continued to build, and as a result the United States declared war on the United Kingdom on June 12, 1812. This occurred after Madison had been nominated by the Democratic-Republicans, but before the Federalists had made their nomination.

The Federalist Party had dominated the American government from 1789 to 1801 under Alexander Hamilton whilst retaining a stronghold in New England. It made a brief resurgence in the 1812 election by opposing the war, and dissolved shortly after in 1834.

See also
1812 United States presidential election
1812–13 United States House of Representatives elections
1812–13 United States Senate elections

References

1812 elections in the United States
1812